Elizabeth Scott Cochran is a seismologist known for her work on early warning systems for earthquakes and human-induced earthquakes.

Education and career 
As a middle-school student living in California, Cochran experiences the 1989 Loma Prieta earthquake. Cochran has a B.S. from the University of California, Santa Barbara (2000) and went on to earn an M.Sc.(2003) and a Ph.D.(2005) from the University of California. Following her Ph.D. Cochran was a postdoctoral investigator at the University of California, San Diego. From 2007 until 2011 Cochran was an assistant professor at the University of California, Riverside, until she joined the United States Geological Survey.

Research 

Cochran's early research was on the impact of the 1999 Hector Mine earthquake. Her subsequent work examined the geographic extent of earthquake damage, and defined the factors that lead to the 2011 Oklahoma earthquake. In 2006, Cochran co-foundered of Quake-Catcher Network, a crowd-sourced program that detects earthquakes.  Quake-Cather Network was able to track the 2008 Reno earthquakes. The original idea was to use laptops to track earthquakes, but as the project evolved it outfitted citizen scientists with seismometers which are used to detect earthquakes. Later, Cochran was the lead scientist for ShakeAlert, an early warning system for earthquakes in the western United States.

Selected publications

Awards and honors 
In 2006 Cochran received the Doris M. Curtis Outstanding Woman in Science Award from the Geological Society of America. In 2010 Cochran received a Presidential Early Career Award for Scientists and Engineers, which is an honor given to early career scientists in the United States.

References

External links 

 

Living people
University of California, Los Angeles
University of California, Santa Barbara
United States Geological Survey personnel
Seismologists
Women geologists
Year of birth missing (living people)